The Jaipur-Atrauli Gharana (also known as Jaipur Gharana, Atrauli-Jaipur Gharana, and Alladiyakhani Gayaki) is an Hindustani music apprenticeship fraternity (gharana), founded by Alladiya Khan in the late-19th century. Evolved from the dhrupad tradition, but known for khayal, this gharana is known for producing acclaimed musicians like Kesarbai Kerkar, Laxmibai Jadhav, Mogubai Kurdikar, Mallikarjun Mansur, Shruti Sadolikar, Dhondutai Kulkarni Consequently, this gharana developed a reputation for its distinctive vocal aesthetics, raga repertoire, and technical aptitude.

History
The Jaipur-Atrauli gharana emerged from Alladiya Khan's family which originated from Atrauli (near Aligarh) and migrated to Jaipur. This gharana mainly evolved from Dagar-bani of Dhrupad, however it also absorbed finer essence of Gauhar-bani and Khandar-bani.

Etymology
A subgroup of the broader Atrauli gharana, the Jaipur-Atrauli gharana includes "Jaipur" to account for the geographical history of Alladiya Khan's family.

Scholars say the hyphenated moniker of this gharana recognizes that Jaipur-Atrauli gharana musicians originally came from Atrauli Village in Aligarh district and migrated to the court of the Maharaja of Jaipur, their principal patron. Others say they came to the Jaipur Maharaja's court and then dispersed to various other courts in the area, like Jodhpur, Uniyara, Bundi, Atrauli.

Roots in Haveli Sangeet
Many of the ragas and compositions sung in the Jaipur gharana come from the tradition of Haveli Sangeet and dhrupad, such as:
 "Deva Deva Satsang" in Savani Kalyan
 "Ey Pyari Pag Hole" in Bihagada
 "Mero Piya Rasiya" in Nayaki Kanada
 "Anahat Aadi Naad" in Savani Nat
 "Devta Aadi Sab" in Kukubh Bilawal
 "Devi Durge" in Sukhiya Bilawal
 "Ye Ho Neend Na Ayaee" in Bihari
 "Papiha Na Bole" in Jayat Kalyan
 "Jabase Piyu Sapaneme" Jaitashree
 "Preetam Sainya" Lalita Gauri
 "Ree Tum Samajh" Rayasa Kanada.

Aesthetics

Gayaki
The gharana is known for its unique layakari (rhythmic aesthetics) and rich repertoire of ragas, especially jod ragas (compound ragas) and sankeerna ragas (mixed ragas).
Most gharanas apply notes in simple succession in aalap and taan, whereas in the Jaipur gayaki, notes are applied in an oblique manner with filigree involving immediately neighbouring notes. Instead of the flat taan, gamak (taan sung with double notes with a delicate force behind each of the component double-notes of the taan) makes the taan spiral into seemingly never-ending cycles. Meend in aalap and gamak in taan are the hallmark of this gayaki. Sharp edged harkats and murkis (crisp, quick phrases to ornament the alaap) are relatively uncommon. Not only are the notes sung in rhythm with the taal but progress between the matras (beats) is in fractions of quarters and one-eighths. While being mindful of so many factors, musicians of this gharana still have a graceful way of arriving at the Sam without having matras to spare. This is particularly evident in the way bol-alaap or bol-taan is sung, where meticulous attention is given to the short and long vowels in the words of the bandish that are being pronounced, and the strict discipline of avoiding unnatural breaks in the words and in the meaning of the lyrics. No other gharana has paid so much attention to the aesthetics and laykari in singing bol-alaaps and bol-taans.

Specialty and Jod Raags
Signature and specialty ragas of this gharana (some revived or created by Alladiya Khan) include Sampoorna Malkauns, Basanti Kedar, Basant Bahar, Bihagda, Khat, Gandhari and Nat Kamod.
A highlight of Jaipur gayaki is the mastery over Jod Ragas (mixed or hybrid Raags). Singers from other gharanas tend to sing one raga in aaroha (ascent) and the other in avaroha (descent). Some others sing one raga in the lower half of the octave and then switch to the other raga in the upper half. Alternatively, they may sing alternate phrases of the two component ragas. In Jaipur gayaki, the two ragas are fused so that it sounds like a homogeneous raga in its own right, giving the feel of both component ragas, not as a heterogeneous mixture cobbled together. The listener hears an amalgam of both ragas without losing their distinctive identity. Alladiya Khan introduced many lesser-known or obscure ragas in his repertoire such as Basanti Kedar, Jait Kalyan, Kafi Kanada, Raisa Kanada, Basanti Kanada, Savani Nat, Savani Kalyan, Bhoop Nat, Nat Kamod, Bihari, Khat, Khokar, Pat bihag and Sampoorna Malkauns.

Legacy
To his immense credit, the great exponent of Kirana gharana, Bhimsen Joshi is one of the very few singers outside the Jaipur gharana, who tried to adopt the gamak taan to some extent, but he has not quite achieved the intricacy and grace of gamak that is the signature of Jaipur.

Pedagogical Genealogy

Ancestral Pedagogy of Jaipur-Atrauli Gharana
The following visualization is based on several historical accounts.

Recent Pedagogy of Jaipur-Atrauli Gharana
This tree needs references, and may not be upto date or correct.

Exponents

20th Century
Alladiya Khan (1855–1946), Gharana founder; learned from uncle Jehangir Khan.
Haider Ali Khan, learned from uncle Jehangir Khan and the older brother of Alladiya Khan.
Bhaskarbuwa Bakhale (1869–1922), learned from Alladiya Khan and Natthan Khan
Manji Khan (1888–1937), second son of Alladiya Khan. Learned from Alladiya Khan.
Bhurji Khan (1890–1956), third son of Alladiya Khan. Learned from Alladiya Khan.
Gulubhai Jasdanwalla, learned from Alladiya Khan.
Kesarbai Kerkar (1892–1977), learned from Alladiya Khan.
Laxmibai Jadhav (1901–1979), learned from Haider Khan.
Mogubai Kurdikar (1904–2001), learned from Alladiya Khan and Haider Khan.
Wamanrao Sadolikar (1907–1986), learned from Bhurji Khan and attended many of Alladiya Khan's lessons to his disciples.
Vamanrao Deshpande (1907–1990), learned from Natthan Khan and Mogubai Kurdikar.
Mallikarjun Mansur (1910–1992), learned from Manji Khan, Bhurji Khan, and later from Azizuddin Khan.
Gajananrao Joshi (1911-1987), learned from Bhurji Khan.
Nivruttibuwa Sarnaik (1912-1994), learned from Alladiya Khan.
Madhusudan Kanetkar (1916-2007), learned from Bhurji Khan.
Kausalya Manjeshwar (1922-2007), learned from Mogubai Kurdikar and Ganjananbuwa Joshi.
"Baba" Azizzudin Khan (1921-2011), son and disciple of Bhurji Khan and also learned from grandfather Alladiya Khan.
Panchakshari Swami Mattigatti (1927-2013), learned from Mallikarjun Mansur.
Babanrao Haldankar (1927-2016), learned from Mogubai Kurdikar.
Dhondutai Kulkarni (1927–2014), learned from Natthan Khan, Manji Khan, Bhurji Khan, Laxmibai Jadhav, Azizuddin Khan, and Kesarbai Kerkar.
Ratnakar Pai (1928–2009), learned from Gulubhai Jasdanwalla and Mohanrao Palekar.
Kishori Amonkar (1931–2017), daughter and disciple of Mogubai Kurdikar. Also learned from Mohanrao Palekar, Anwar Hussein Khan of Agra Gharana, and Anjanibai Malpekar of Bhendi-Bazar Gharana.
Manik Bhide (b. 1935), learned from Madhukar Sadolikar and Kishori Amonkar.
Dinkar Panshikar (1936-2020), learned from Nivruttibua Sarnaik.
Rajshekhar Mansur (1942 - 2022), learned from father Mallikarjun Mansur.
Arun Dravid (b. 1943), learned from Abdul Majid Khan, Mogubai Kurdikar, and Kishori Amonkar.
Kumundini Katdare (b. 1945), learned from Kamal Tambe and Madhusudan Kanetkar.
Padma Talwalkar (b. 1948), learned from Mogubai Kurdikar and Gajananrao Joshi.
Shruti Sadolikar (b. 1951), learned from father Wamanrao Sadolikar, Baba Azizuddin Khan, and later Gulubhai Jasdanwalla.
Alka Deo Marulkar (b. 1951), learned from Rajubhau and Madhusuran Kanetkar.
Milind Malshe (b. 1952), learned from Ratnakar Pai and Ashok Ranade.
Bharati Vaishampayan (1954-2020), learned from Nivruttibuwa Sarnaik.
Vijaya Jadhav Gatlewar (b. 1955), learned from Nivruttibuwa Sarnaik.
Ashwini Bhide Deshpande (b. 1960), learned from mother Manik Bhide and later from Ratnakar Pai.
Raghunandan Panshikar (b. 1963) learned from Kishori Amonkar and Mogubai Kurdikar.
Nandini Bedekar (b. 1966) learned from Kishori Amonkar and was guided by Mogubai Kurdikar.
Sanjay Dixit (b. 1964), learned from Madhusudan Kanetkar, Bhaskarbuwa Shaligram, and Dhondutai Kulkarni.
Manjiri Asnare-Kelkar (b. 1971), learned from Madhusudan Kanetkar.
Gauri Pathare (b. 1972), learned from Padma Talwalkar and Arun Dravid.
Yashaswi Sirpotdar (b. 1980), learned from Padma Talwalkar.
Mithun Chakravarthy (b. 1981), learned from Rajshekhar Mansur.
Aditya Khandwe (b. 1983), learned from Ratnakar Pai and Dhondutai Kulkarni.
Tejashree Amonkar (b. 1985), learned from her grandmother, Kishori Amonkar, and guided by great-grandmother, Mogubai Kurdikar.
Rutuja Lad (b. 1992), learned from Dhondutai Kulkarni and Ashwini Bhide-Deshpande.
Aarya Ambekar (b. 1994), learned from Shruti Ambekar and Devaki Pandit.

References

Bibliography

Vocal gharanas
Culture of Jaipur
Aligarh district
Kolhapur
Jaipur gharana